The Scottsdale Public Library is the public library system for Scottsdale, Arizona, and is owned and operated by the City of Scottsdale. As of 2020 the library system serves Scottsdale’s 241,361 residents as well as residents of Maricopa County and numerous visitors to the city from around the world. The library’s collection contains over 800,000 items (including books, magazines, DVDs, CDs, audio books and more). The library circulates around 2.5 million items per year.

Mission statement
As Scottsdale's population continues to increase, the mission of the Scottsdale Public Library System remains more steadfast than ever: “Putting People at the Heart of Dynamic Library Services.”

History
The Scottsdale Public Library was started in the summer of 1955 by Lou Ann Noel and Beth Fielder. Located in the un-air-conditioned Adobe House, which at the time served as a community center, the library was originally open for only two hours, two mornings a week, and its collection consisted of 300 donated books.

In 1959 the Friends of the Library, a non-profit, community organization made up entirely of volunteers, was organized to support and fund-raise for the library. In 1960 the City of Scottsdale assumed responsibility for the library and hired the first professionally trained librarian. Later, the City hired additional paid staff to keep up with the demands of the community and, in 1968, opened a new  main library.

Much has changed since the library’s conception in 1955: four branches were added, buildings and services have been renovated and expanded, staff and volunteers have come and gone, and technology has been upgraded with the times. The days of card catalogs may be over, but the library still plays a vital role in the lives and education of Scottsdale residents.

Branches
The Scottsdale Public Library system has four active locations: a main library and three branches—Mustang, Arabian, and Appaloosa—which, in keeping with the city's western culture, were named after horse breeds. Civic Center and Mustang Libraries are among 300 libraries in 23 states that have received the designation of Family Place Libraries™ for their welcoming, child friendly environments. Family Place believes good health, early learning, parental involvement and supportive communities contribute to the growth and development of children. Designated libraries offer a five-week parent/child workshop, appropriate collections and space, as well as staff trained in family support.

Civic Center, the main library, is located in the Civic Center plaza in downtown Scottsdale. It is home to the Scottsdale Room which contains numerous books, maps, photographs, and pieces of artwork that focus on Scottsdale, Arizona and the surrounding area.
Mustang library, opened in 1987, is the first and the largest of the Scottsdale branches. At the time of its opening, it was the largest branch library in the state.
Palomino library, opened in 1995 as a shared-use facility located on the campus of Desert Mountain High School and served both the public and the school’s students and staff. This location reverted back to a school library only on May 21, 2020 after the Intergovernmental Agreement between the City of Scottsdale and the Scottsdale Unified School District was phased out.
Arabian library opened in 1996 as a shared-use facility located on the campus of Desert Canyon Elementary and Middle Schools. In 2007 the Arabian library separated itself from the schools and re-opened in a new building across the street from its original location. For its unique design, this library won the 2008 International Interior Design Association/Metropolis Smart Environments Award.
Appaloosa library opened on November 4, 2009 on the grounds previously occupied by the Rawhide Wild West Town.  It is a LEED Gold Certified building and winner of multiple architecture awards.

References

External links
The Scottsdale Public Library Web site

Public libraries in Arizona
Buildings and structures in Scottsdale, Arizona
Education in Scottsdale, Arizona
Tourist attractions in Scottsdale, Arizona